The Lincoln Land Championship is a golf tournament on the Korn Ferry Tour. It was first played in July 2016 at Panther Creek Country Club in Springfield, Illinois.

Winners

Bolded golfers graduated to the PGA Tour via the Korn Ferry Tour regular-season money list.

References

External links

Coverage on the Korn Ferry Tour's official site

Korn Ferry Tour events
Golf in Illinois
Sports in Springfield, Illinois
Recurring sporting events established in 2016
2016 establishments in Illinois